El Saucejo is a town in the province of Seville, Spain. As of the 2005 census (INE), the city had a population of 4379.

References

External links
El Saucejo - Sistema de Información Multiterritorial de Andalucía

Municipalities of the Province of Seville